

Afghanistan

Albania

Algeria

Angola

Argentina

Armenia

Australia

Austria

Azerbaijan

Bahamas

Bahrain

Bangladesh
Main article: List of cities and towns in Bangladesh

Belarus

Belgium

Benin

Bolivia

Bosnia and Herzegovina

Botswana

Brazil

Bulgaria

Burkina Faso

Burundi

See also 
 World largest cities

References

2014 United Nations Demographic Yearbook (Table 8: Population of capital cities and cities of 100,000 or more inhabitants: latest available year, 1995 - 2014) United Nations Statistics Division, accessed 15 November 2016

Towns and cities with 100,000 or more inhabitants
100,000 or more inhabitants
A